Khoroshyovo-Mnyovniki – sometimes spelled Khoroshyovo-Mnevniki or Khoroshevo-Mnevniki due to common replacement of letter "yo" with "ye" in Russian – is a neighborhood of North-Western Borough of the federal city of Moscow, Russia. It is about 7 km west of the center of Moscow, with the Moscow river bordering the western and southern sides.

Population:   It is the second most populous neighborhood of the borough (after Mitino).

Attractions
Approximately one third of the district is occupied by Serebryany Bor ("Silver Pinewood") park. Also in the district are Holy Trinity Church in Khoroshyovo, and Terekhovo village.

References

See also
Administrative divisions of Moscow

Districts of Moscow
North-Western Administrative Okrug